Leptothorax longispinosus is an American species of ant.

Description
Leptothorax longispinosus are yellowish, with well-separated propodial spines.

References

Insects described in 1863
longispinosus